Jean-Baptiste-Antoine Suard (15 January 1732 – 20 July 1817) was a French journalist, translator and man of letters during the Age of Enlightenment. He was born in Besançon and died in Paris.

Biography
Suard was incarcerated in the Royal Fort ("Fort Royal") on Saint Marguerite Island between 1751 and 1753.

On 16 January 1766, he married Amélie Panckoucke, sister of Charles-Joseph Panckoucke.

He was the editor of the Journal étranger in the years 1760–1762 and of the Gazette littéraire d'Europe in the years 1764–1766.

Suard was on intimate terms with the philosophes and regularly attended the salon of Baron d'Holbach, although he seems to have eschewed their more radical ideas. Suard was a close acquaintance with the Marquis de Condorcet, having stayed in residence with him back in 1772. In 1774 he was made a member of the French Academy, and later a state censor.  For all his caution, Suard would later be harassed by both the Revolutionary and the Napoleonic regimes. His Mélanges de littérature were published in 1803–1805.

Bibliography
 Académie française: "Jean-Baptiste-Antoine Suard".

References

External links
 

1733 births
1817 deaths
Writers from Besançon
Members of the Académie Française
18th-century French writers
18th-century French male writers
French translators
18th-century French journalists
18th-century French translators